Portals to Hell is an American paranormal reality television series hosted by Jack Osbourne and Katrina Weidman, in which they visit allegedly haunted locations believed to contain portals or entries to hell. The series premiered on 2019 on Travel Channel. The series was renewed for a third season, which premiered April 9, 2022.

Episodes

Series overview

Season 1 (2019)

Season 2 (2020–21)

Season 3 (2022)

Specials

Release
In the United States, the series airs on the Travel Channel and is also available for streaming on Discovery+. In the United Kingdom and other European territories, it is available via Sky TV.

References

External links

Travel Channel original programming
Paranormal reality television series
2019 American television series debuts
2010s American reality television series
English-language television shows